Kolasib is a town and headquarters of Kolasib district in Mizoram, India.

Demographics

As of the 2011 Census of India, Kolasib district had a population of 83,955. Males constitute 51.12% of the population and females 48.88%. Kolasib has an average literacy rate of 93.50%, higher than the national average of 74.04%: male literacy is 94.57%, and female literacy is 92.38%. Population growth rate of Kolasib district was 27.28 percent during the decade.

Economy
Kolasib is agriculture-dominated economy with a few service sector jobs as it is a district capital. A large number of people cultivate beetle nut, oil palms, rice, wheat and fish which is both consumed and exported to other districts of Mizoram.

Transport
A helicopter service by Pawan Hans has been started which connects the Aizawl  with Kolasib. The distance between Kolasib and Aizawl through NH 54 is 83 km and is connected with regular service of bus and Maxi-Cabs.

Education 
There is one college - Government Kolasib College, under Mizoram University and a number of public and private schools.

The Major Higher Secondary School in Kolasib are:
St. John's Higher Secondary School, Kolasib
C. Zakhuma Higher Secondary School (CZS), Kolasib
Madonna Open School

Media
The Major Newspapers in Kolasib are:
Duhlai Daily
Ramnuam
Kolasib Times
Kolasib Today
Turnipui
Chhuahtlang Daily
Vairengte Aw: 
Kolasib Aw
Zingtian Daily
Rengkhawpui
Zoram Kanaan

Major Television Cable Network in Kolasib are:
 Kolasib Cable Network (KCN)
 C.Zakhuma Cable Network (CZS)

References

External links
 Kolasib official website

 
Cities and towns in Kolasib district